Moody High School is a public high school located on the south edge of Moody, Texas, USA and classified as a 2A school by the UIL.  It is part of the Moody Independent School District located in southwestern McLennan County and extends into portions of Coryell County and Bell County, Texas.   In 2015, the school was rated "Met Standard" by the Texas Education Agency.

Athletics
The Moody Bearcats compete in these sports - 

Cross Country, Volleyball, Football, Powerlifting, Basketball, Golf, Tennis, Track, Softball & Baseball

State Titles
Boys Track 
1975(B)

References

External links
Moody ISD website

Schools in McLennan County, Texas
Public high schools in Texas